Masjid (station code: MSD) is a railway station in the Masjid Bunder area of South Mumbai on the Central and Harbour lines of the Mumbai Suburban Railway. It is the penultimate stop for all trains on those lines in the "up" direction. It was opened in 1877. The station is  named after a masjid (mosque) annexed to this Suburban Railway Station.  Contrary to popular belief a synagogue, is never called a masjid. This Railway station is in Mandvi Section.

According to The Gazetteer of Bombay City and Island (1909), “The Masjid station of the Great Indian Peninsula Railway, which earns a name from a wealthy mosque in the neighbourhood, is situated about the middle of the section; and close at hand is the Masjid Bandar bridge"

The station has four platforms (two for Harbour Line and two for Main Line). The volume of passengers on this station is very high due to different wholesale markets (i.e., Crawford Market) surrounding the station. These markets, referred to as bazaars, have various wholesale merchants, called stockists.

Stockists from the Iron Market (Lokhand Bazaar), situated on the Eastern side of the railway station and Diamond Traders situated on Western side make trades of millions of Rupees each day in the markets. The southern end towards CSMT leads to Yousuf Mehar Ali Road, Jama Masjid, Kalbadevi, Crawford Market, Mandvi and the surrounding area.

Due to the docks, Masjid is a prominent area recognized as the hub of the larger shipping and maritime companies of India. The first office of the Reliance Commercial Corporation was set up at the Narsinathan Street in Masjid Bunder.

References

Railway stations in India opened in 1877
Railway stations in Mumbai City district
Mumbai Suburban Railway stations
Mumbai CR railway division
1877 establishments in India